is a Japanese manga series written and illustrated by Aruko. Yasuko to Kenji was serialized in the shōjo manga magazine Bessatsu Margaret from April 2005 to November 2006. In 2008, the series was adapted into a comedy drama which aired in Japan on Nippon Television.

Plot
The show focuses on a man named Kenji and his younger sister Yasuko, whose parents died in an accident 10 years earlier. Kenji was once the leader of a gang, but in order to support him and his sister, he began making a living as a shōjo manga artist. His character normally wears glasses and appears to be a gentle guy, but he throws off his glasses and reverts to his violent side whenever he tries to protect Yasuko from danger. Part of the story follows Yasuko's romance with an intelligent and good-looking man named Jun Tsubaki. Jun's older sister Erika Tsubaki now runs a flower shop, but Erika was once a leader of a female gang, and she used to be in love with Kenji during those days.

Media

Live action drama
Masahiro Matsuoka's band Tokio performed the theme song, "Amagasa," which was written by Ringo Sheena.

List of episodes

Cast
Masahiro Matsuoka as Oki Kenji
Ryōko Hirosue as Tsubaki Erika
Mikako Tabe as Oki Yasuko
Tadayoshi Okura as Tsubaki Jun
Haruna Kojima as Shingyoji Hiyoko

References

External links 

Japanese drama television series
2005 manga
Shueisha manga
Shōjo manga
Nippon TV dramas
2009 Japanese television series debuts
2008 Japanese television series endings